General elections were held in India in 1984 soon after the assassination of previous Prime Minister, Indira Gandhi, though the vote in Assam and Punjab was delayed until 1985 due to ongoing fighting.

The elections were a landslide victory for the Indian National Congress of Rajiv Gandhi (son of Indira Gandhi),  which won 404 of the 514 seats elected in 1984 and a further 10 in the delayed elections. The Telugu Desam Party of N. T. Rama Rao, a regional political party from the state of Andhra Pradesh, was the second largest party, winning 30 seats, thus achieving the distinction of becoming the first regional party to become a national opposition party. Voting was held immediately after the assassination of Indira Gandhi and the 1984 anti-Sikh riots in November and most of India supported Congress.

The 1984 elections were the last in which a single party won a majority of seats until 2014, and the only time to date in which a party won more than 400 seats.

Results

Delayed elections in Assam and Punjab

See also
Election Commission of India
1982 Indian presidential election

References

 
General elections in India
1984 elections in India
India
India